Viodos-Abense-de-Bas is a commune in the Pyrénées-Atlantiques department in south-western France.

It is located in the former province of Soule.

The steeple of the church is a trinitarian one.

Hydrography 
The lands of the commune are watered by the Saison, which flows into the Gave d'Oloron, and by its tributary, the brook Borlaas.

Places and hamlets 
The municipality of Viodos-Abense-de-Bas consists of eight districts:

Viodos 

 Bürgüa;
 Ekhibegia;
 Errekalde (Errekaltea on the IGN maps);
 Harizbidea (Haiz Bidia on IGN maps);
 Ordokia (La Plaine in French);
 Zübüalde (Zübialdea on the IGN maps)

Abense-de-Bas 

 Onizepea ( Abense-de-Bas in French);
 Plaxotalte

Education 
The town has two schools: the public primary school Abense-de-Bas and the public primary school Bourg.

Economy 
The activity is mainly focused on agriculture (livestock and pasture).

See also
Communes of the Pyrénées-Atlantiques department

References

Communes of Pyrénées-Atlantiques
Pyrénées-Atlantiques communes articles needing translation from French Wikipedia